Kruschwitz may refer to:
German name of Kruszwica, town in central Poland, Kuyavian-Pomeranian Voivodeship
 Treaty of Kruschwitz (German: Vertrag von Kruschwitz)

People with the surname
 Dr. Peter Kruschwitz
 Dr. Mitchel Linhart Kruschwitz

See also 
 Krauschwitz
 Krauschwitz, Saxony-Anhalt